Dokapon Journey, known in Japan as  is a 2008 RPG/board game developed by Suzak Inc. and published by Sting Entertainment in Japan for the Nintendo DS on July 31, 2008. It was later published by Atlus in North America on April 14, 2009.

Reception 

The game received "mixed" reviews according to the review aggregation website Metacritic. In Japan, Famitsu gave it a score of 27 out of 40.

Notes

References

External links 
 Official North American website
 

Role-playing video games
Atlus games
Journey
Nintendo DS games
Nintendo DS-only games
Sting Entertainment games
Video games featuring protagonists of selectable gender
2008 video games
Digital tabletop games
Video games developed in Japan
Multiplayer and single-player video games
Suzak Inc. games